Municipio Roma VII is the seventh administrative subdivision of the Municipality of Rome (Italy).

It was established by the Municipal Assembly, with Resolution nr. 11 of 11 March 2013, following the unification of Municipio Roma IX (formerly Circoscrizione IX) and Municipio Roma X (formerly Circoscrizione X). It is the most populous Municipio in the city, the only one with more than 300,000 inhabitants.

Geography 
The territory of the Municipio extends in the south-eastern quadrant of the city, from Porta San Giovanni to the border of the Municipality of Rome, along the road axes of Via Appia Nuova and Via Tuscolana.

Its borders are:
 to the north-west, the Aurelian Walls;
 to the north, the Rome–Cassino–Naples railway, the former Centocelle Airport and the Autostrada A1;
 to the east, the Municipalities of Grottaferrata and Frascati;
 to the south, Via Appia Nuova and the Municipality of Ciampino;
 to the west, the Appian Way Regional Park.

History 
The territory of the Municipio was inhabited since prehistoric times, as shown by the excavations of the four necropolises of Osteria del Curato-Via Cinquefrondi, Lucrezia Romana, Romanina and Ponte delle Sette Miglia, with rock-out chamber tombs from the Copper Age, related to the so-called Rinaldone culture.

In Roman times, the territory of the Municipio was crossed by the Via Latina and the Via Asinaria.
As in the rest of the Ager Romanus – also thanks to several aqueducts that crossed it – there were numerous villae, that is, farming estates of medium extension whose production was at the service of the city.

In the Middle Ages the villae were converted into Domuscultae and fortifications and later into farmhouses and towers (such as Tor Fiscale, Torre del Quadraro and Torre di Mezzavia), in close relationship with the settlements towards the Roman Castles. The ancient Roman roads were replaced first by Via Tuscolana and then, in 1574, by Via Appia Nuova, opened by Gregory XIII. In place of the broken aqueducts, in 1122 Callixtus II dug the artificial canal of Acqua Mariana, while in 1587 Sixtus V built the Felice aqueduct, which crosses Via Tuscolana near Porta Furba.

Until the beginning of the 20th century the territory boasted many vineyards and villas – most of which were destroyed due to the subsequent building expansion or, in a few surviving cases, whose area was greatly reduced (the present Villa Lais, Villa Fiorelli and Villa Lazzaroni) – as well as production plants and mills exploiting the water power of Acqua Mariana.

The urbanization of the territory began with the master plan of 1909, which declared the areas within the railway to be suitable for small-size buildings and villas, including those that survived around Villa Fiorelli.
A tramway line connecting with the Roman castles was also inaugurated in 1903, the Sound stages of Cines film company in 1905 and the Motovelodromo Appio (later demolished) in 1910.

Both the size of the buildings and the population density, however, increased with the 1925 variant and the new 1931 master plan, resulting in an intensive urban fabric in the Quartieri Appio-Latino and Tuscolano, with tall buildings and very few green areas.
Meanwhile, in breach of the master plan, various unauthorized settlements arose – such as the Quadraro – as well as "hamlets" made of shacks built against the arches (on Via del Mandrione, at the Caffarella and at the Felice aqueduct, restored and demolished only in the late 1970s).

The year 1937 saw the inauguration of the Cinecittà studios (together with the Istituto Luce and the Centro Sperimentale di Cinematografia), where all the greatest directors and actors of Italian cinema shot movies and which became the "Hollywood on the Tiber" in the years of the Dolce Vita, with many famous American productions (the so-called "colossals").

During the Nazi occupation of Rome in World War II, the inhabitants actively participated in the Resistance, to the point that on 17 April 1944 the German army, as a reprisal, carried out a mop-up in the Quadraro, deporting between 700 and 950 men to Germany. On 17 April 2004 the then Municipio X was awarded the Gold Medal for Civil Valor.

After the war, the building expansion continued with the intensive palaces of the Quartieri Don Bosco and Appio Claudio, eventually endangering the Caffarella valley; an exception were the "INA-Casa" buildings between Viale Spartaco and Via Selinunte (on-line, tower and one-family houses with an original urban design, built by the best architects of the "Neorealistic" movement, such as Adalberto Libera).
Moving towards the boundaries of the Municipality, there is a prevalence of both extensive buildings, which have been at least partly built illegally (Quarto Miglio, Statuario, Tor Fiscale, Capannelle, Osteria del Curato, Morena, Gregna, Romanina, Vermicino, Passolombardo), as well as modern districts with greater endowments of public green (Cinecittà Est, Torre di Mezzavia, Nuova Romanina, Nuova Tor Vergata).

The new Roman master plan includes the planning of the urban centrality of Anagnina-Romanina.

Monuments and places of interest 

Porta Metronia, Porta Asinaria and Porta San Giovanni in the Aurelian Walls
Mausoleum of Severus Alexander, also known as Monte del Grano
Columbaria of Via Pescara and Columbarium of Pomponius Hylas
Hypogeum of Via Compagni
Acqua Felice and Porta Furba, built in 1587
Capannelle Racecourse, inaugurated in 1881 and rebuilt in 1926
Basilica of Santa Maria Ausiliatrice, consecrated in 1936
Former seat of Istituto Luce, built in 1937 in Piazza di Cinecittà and currently seat of the Municipality
Cinecittà film studios, inaugurated in 1937 and linked to the name of Federico Fellini
Centro Sperimentale di Cinematografia, whose present seat was inaugurated in 1937
Basilica of San Giovanni Bosco, consecrated in 1959
Antiquarium di Lucrezia Romana, inaugurated in 2005

Parks and villas 
 Parco degli Acquedotti with seven ancient roman and papal aqueducts: Anio Vetus (underground), Marcia, Tepula, Iulia and Acqua Felice (overlapped), Claudia and Anio novus (overlapped)
 Park of the Caffarella, with the river Almone, part of the Appian Way Regional Park
Parco XVII Aprile 1944 and Monte del Grano
Tombs of Via Latina Archaeological Park
 Villa of the sette bassi
 Villa Fiorelli
 Villa Lais
 Villa Lazzaroni

Libraries 
 Nelson Mandela, on Via La Spezia
 Raffaello, on Via Tuscolana
 Casa dei Bimbi, on Via Libero Leonardi

Human geography

Historic divisions 
The territory of the Municipio includes the following toponymic districts of the Municipality of Rome.
Quartieri
 Q. VII Prenestino-Labicano (partly), Q. VIII Tuscolano (partly), Q. IX Appio-Latino (partly), Q. XXIV Don Bosco (partly), Q. XXV Appio Claudio, Q. XXVI Appio-Pignatelli (partly)
Zone
 Z. XV Torre Maura (partly), Z. XVI Torrenova (partly), Z. XVII Torre Gaia (partly), Z. XVIII Capannelle, Z. XIX Casal Morena, Z. XX Aeroporto di Ciampino (partly)

Administrative divisions 
The urban division of the territory includes the five urban zones of the former Municipio IX and the eleven ones of the former Municipio X. Its population is distributed as follows:

Infrastructure and transport

Streets 
Road mobility in radial direction is ensured by Via Appia Nuova, Via Tuscolana Via Anagnina, as well as the Rome-Naples motorway, which intersect the Grande Raccordo Anulare.

Railways 
 It is served by the following stations: San Giovanni, Re di Roma, Ponte Lungo, Furio Camillo, Colli Albani, Arco di Travertino, Porta Furba/Quadraro, Numidio Quadrato, Lucio Sestio, Giulio Agricola, Subaugusta, Cinecittà, Anagnina
 It is served by the following stations: San Giovanni, Lodi

 Lazio suburban rail. Line 1: Roma Tuscolana, Line 3: Roma Tuscolana, Line 4: Capannelle, Line 5: Roma Tuscolana, Line 6: Capannelle

Almost half of the Line A of the Metro runs inside the Municipio, including the large interchange junction of Anagnina, with the terminus of Cotral suburban bus services along Via Tuscolana, Via Casilina, Via Anagnina, Via Appia and Via Nettunense.

At the Ponte Lungo station it is possible to exchange at the Tuscolana station the FL1, FL3 and FL5 regional railway lines; the other station in the area is that of Capannelle on the FL4 and FL6 lines.

In 2015 the Lodi station of the Line C was inaugurated: it was a temporary terminus until the opening of the San Giovanni station in 2018.

Airports 
 Giovan Battista Pastine International Airport, on the border with the municipality of Ciampino.

Administration

Twinning 
The former Municipio IX was twinned with Hai, Hai District, Kilimanjaro Region,

Sport

basketball 
 Carver Cinecittà: in the season 2019–2020 plays in the men's Serie C championship.
 Cinecittà BK Polaris: in the season 2019–2020 plays in the men's Serie C championship.

References

Bibliography

External links 

Municipi of Rome